Bret Bonanni (born 20 January 1994) is a water polo player from the United States. He was part of the American team at the 2016 Summer Olympics, where the team finished in tenth place.

References

External links
 

American male water polo players
Living people
1994 births
Olympic water polo players of the United States
Water polo players at the 2016 Summer Olympics
Pan American Games gold medalists for the United States
Pan American Games medalists in water polo
Water polo players at the 2015 Pan American Games
Medalists at the 2015 Pan American Games